The following is a timeline of the history of the city of Lleida in Catalonia, Spain.

Prior to 20th century

 216 BCE - Hanno II the Great was defeated by Scipio Africanus nearby.
 49 BCE - Battle of Ilerda fought during Caesar's Civil War.
 400-500 CE - Roman Catholic Diocese of Lleida established.
 546 - Religious council held.
 793 - The Franks in power.
 797 - Re-taken by the Moors.
 832 - Old Cathedral of Lleida rebuilt to serve as a mosque.
 1039 - Muslim Taifa of Lérida begins.
 1149 - Christian Ramon Berenguer IV, Count of Barcelona in power.
 1278 - Cathedral of St. Mary of La Seu Vella consecrated.
 1300 - University of Lleida established by James II of Aragon.
 1390 - Public clock installed (approximate date).
 1445 -  (city archives) active (approximate date).
 1479 - Printing press in use.
 1669 -  construction begins.
 1707 -  by French forces.
 1717
 University of Lleida closed by order of Philip V of Spain.
 University of Cervera opened by order of Philip V of Spain.
 1719 -  (government entity) established.
 1781 - New Cathedral of Lleida built.
 1810 - Lleida besieged by French forces.
 1834 - Sociedad Económica de Amigos del País de Lerida established.
 1835 - University of Cervera closed.
 1842 - Population: 12,236.
 1860 - Railway begins operating.
 1864 -  (park) opens.

20th century

 1900 - Population: 21,432.
 1910 - Population: 24,531.
 1912 -  (art exhibit) held.
 1915 - Cinema Vinyes built.(en)
 1917 - Museu d'Art Jaume Morera (museum) opens.
 1924 - Balaguer-Lleida railway begins operating.
 1938 - La Mañana newspaper begins publication.
 1942 - Institut d'Estudis Ilerdencs established.
 1950 - Population: 52,849.
 1951 - Teatre Principal (theatre) active.
 1952 - Archivo Histórico Provincial de Lérida (archives) established.
 1981 - Population: 109,573.
 1982 - Diari Segre newspaper begins publication.
 1985 -  begin operating.
 1989 - CaixaForum Lleida established.
 1992 - University of Lleida established.
 1994 - Auditori Enric Granados (concert hall) built.
 1995 - Lleida Latin-American Film Festival begins.
 1998 - Teatre Municipal de l'Escorxador opens.

21st century

 2004 - Àngel Ros becomes mayor.
 2005 - Autoritat Territorial de la Mobilitat de l'Àrea de Lleida (regional transit entity) established.
 2010 - La Llotja de Lleida (convention centre) opens.
 2011 - Population: 137,283.
 2021 - Catalan rapper and poet Pablo Hasél is jailed for Lèse-majesté, mass protests condemning the arrest

See also
 
 List of mayors of Lleida
 List of bishops of Lleida
 Timeline of Catalan history

Other cities in the autonomous community of Catalonia:(ca)
 Timeline of Barcelona

References

This article incorporates information from the Spanish Wikipedia and Catalan Wikipedia.

Bibliography

External links

 Items related to Lleida, various dates (via Europeana)
 Items related to Lleida, various dates (via Digital Public Library of America)

Lleida
Lleida